Brian Kenny may refer to:

Brian Kenny (artist) (born 1982), American multimedia artist
Brian Kenny (British Army officer) (1934–2017), British Army General
Brian Kenny (politician), Liberal member of the Legislative Assembly of New Brunswick
Brian Kenny (sportscaster) (born 1963), MLB Network personality and journalist